Ardgal mac Conaill (died 520) was a King of Uisnech in Mide of the Ui Neill dynasty. He was the son of Conall Cremthainne (died 480) and grandson of Niall Noígíallach. He is considered the third king of Uisnech in the list in the Book of Leinster.

Ardgal was slain in the Battle of Detna in Druimne Breg by Colgu, King of the Airthir of Airgialla and the high king Muirchertach mac Muiredaig (died 532) on the Louth-Meath border which points to the origins of the family of Diarmait mac Cerbaill in the territory north of the Boyne and Blackwater.

Ardgal's descendants were known as the Cenél nArdgail. They were situated among the Luigne in Co.Meath.

Notes

See also
Kings of Uisnech

References

 Annals of Ulster at CELT: Corpus of Electronic Texts at University College Cork
 Byrne, Francis John (2001), Irish Kings and High-Kings, Dublin: Four Courts Press, 
 Book of Leinster,Rig Uisnig at CELT: Corpus of Electronic Texts at University College Cork
Revised edition of McCarthy's synchronisms at Trinity College Dublin.

External links
CELT: Corpus of Electronic Texts at University College Cork

Kings of Uisnech
6th-century Irish monarchs
520 deaths
Year of birth unknown